The Stanhope United Methodist Church is a historic church built 1920 in Netcong, Morris County, New Jersey. It is across the Musconetcong River from Stanhope. Historically known as The Church in the Glen, it was added to the National Register of Historic Places on January 2, 2013 for its significance in architecture.

Gallery

See also
National Register of Historic Places listings in Morris County, New Jersey
List of Methodist churches in the United States

References

External links
 
 

Netcong, New Jersey
National Register of Historic Places in Morris County, New Jersey
Churches on the National Register of Historic Places in New Jersey
New Jersey Register of Historic Places
Churches in Morris County, New Jersey
Gothic Revival church buildings in New Jersey
Churches completed in 1920
United Methodist churches in New Jersey